George Alexandru (21 November 1957 – 1 January 2016) was a Romanian film and theater actor.

Filmography

  (1978)
  (1980)
  (1983)
  (1985)
 Noi, cei din linia întâi (1985)
 Figuranții (1987)
 François Villon - Poetul vagabond (1987)
 Drumeț în calea lupilor (1988)
 Rezervă la start (1988)
 Mircea (1989)
 Cenușa păsării din vis (1989)
 Coroana de foc (1990)
 Escu (1990) - film TV
 Drumul câinilor (1991)
 Cezara (1991)
 Cum vă place? (1992)
 Înnebunesc și-mi pare rău (1992)
 Balanța (1992)
 Rămânerea (1992)
 Chira Chiralina (1993)
 Vulpe - vânător (1993)
 Polul Sud (1993)
 Oglinda (1994)
 E pericoloso sporgersi (1994)
 Asfalt Tango (1995)
 Huntress: Spirit of the Night (1995)
 Punctul zero (1996)
 Omul zilei (1997)
 Triunghiul Morții (1999)
 Faimosul paparazzo (1999)
 În fiecare zi Dumnezeu ne sărută pe gură (2001)
 Dulcea saună a morții (2003)
 Milionari de weekend (2004)
 Sindromul Timișoara - Manipularea (2004)
 Băieți buni (serial TV, 2005)
 Un espresso (2005)
 Happy End (2006)
 La urgență (serial TV, 2006)
 Cu un pas înainte (serial TV, 2008)
 Supraviețuitorul (2008)
 Nunta mută (2008)
 Casanova, identitate feminină (2008)

References

External links

1957 births
2016 deaths
Romanian male television actors
Romanian male film actors
21st-century Romanian male actors
20th-century Romanian male actors
Male actors from Bucharest
Caragiale National University of Theatre and Film alumni